Ogmios (also known as Ogmius;) was the  Celtic deity of eloquence. He is described as resembling an older version of Heracles, and uses his powers of persuasion to bind men to himself, with stories describing thin, long chains connecting his tongue to the ears of his followers.

Most of the knowledge about Ogmios comes from comparisons between him and powerful deities and heroes in other ancient cultures.

About the deity 
Even though there is not much on the history of Ogmios, one can tell that he was a powerful deity worshipped by the Gauls, the Celtic people of present day France. He is attested not only in Lucian's account, but also in archaeological remains, such as coins and statuary, from the time of the Roman conquest of the Gauls.

Etymology 
French specialists give two different explications of the Gaulish name:  
Philippe Jouët proposed to connect Ogme  to the Indo-European root word *Hek- ‘sharp’, ‘stone’, ‘vault’, and to the Greek akmon (meteorite).

According to Xavier Delamarre, the root word would be  ‘path’, ‘guide’, confirming in this his role as a psychopomp.

Description 
Ogmios was recorded by Lucian, a satirical writer in 2nd-century Samosata in his Hercules. He is described as resembling an older, more tanned version of Heracles, the Greek hero of strength. Ogmios and Heracles both wear lion skins and carry a bow and club in their hands. However Ogmios is depicted with long chains through his smiling mouth that pierce his tongue and attached to the ears of a group of men that willingly and happily follow him. Anne Ross describes dark complexion as "a not uncommon feature of powerful or malevolent supernatural beings".

The most striking aspects of Lucian's image of Ogmios are the thin, long chains running from his tongue to the ears of his followers. The chains, made out of amber and gold, represent Ogmios using his powers of persuasion and eloquence to bind his listeners to his every word. From the description it appears that Ogmios' followers willingly follow him with cheerful faces and try to get as close to Ogmios as they can. This shows that he has the power to change and influence men's minds so that they want to follow him to the ends of the earth.

Roles 
Ogmios is considered to be a binding god and a psychopomp,  both very powerful positions. As a binding god he has the ability to bind people onto himself and control their actions. He can also create defixiones, which are tablets that have curses which he can bind on to other people. There are two known defixiones, recovered from Bregenz, Austria, that Ogmios is said to have created. Not much is known about the story behind the defixiones, but it is known that one such tablet invokes Ogmios to curse a barren woman so that she can never marry a man.

Ogmios is also a psychopomp, binding the souls of the dead onto himself and leading them to the afterlife.

Comparisons to other cultures 
Almost all of the knowledge about Ogmios comes from the comparisons of him to other deities or divine heroes of different ancient cultures. By about 51 B.C. the Roman Empire had conquered Gaul. When the Gauls disappeared so did Ogmios. However, the existence of Ogmios can still be seen in Irish mythology. Their deity, Ogma, has many similarities to Ogmios, which could mean that they were once the same deity.

Greek/Roman 
Long after the Romans conquered the Gauls, the Roman satirist Lucian wrote a satirical story about Celtic beliefs. It describes Lucian and a Celtic man looking at a painting of Ogmios. Lucian's description of the painting is the main source of visual representation of Ogmios.

Initially, Lucian looks at the painting with horror because the painting says that the Celts liken Ogmios to Heracles. Ogmios appears to be an older version of Heracles since both Ogmios and Heracles wear lion skins and carry a bow and club. Lucian is shocked to see that “the (bound) men (following Ogmios) do not think of escaping… In fact, they follow cheerfully and joyously, applauding their leader  and all pressing him close and keeping the leashes slack in their desire to overtake him; apparently, they would be offended if they were let loose!”
 
In the story, a Celtic man explains that the painting shows how the Celts believe Ogmios is similar to Heracles, the Greek hero who defeated many things with his strength. Heracles has the power of strength and Ogmios has the power of eloquence.  The Celts believe that eloquence is the ultimate power because it can enthral men and control them more so than strength can.

Ogmios is also sometimes compared to Hermes, a Greek deity. To the Greeks Hermes was also a symbol of eloquence as well as a psychopomp.

Irish 
The Irish deity closest related to Ogmios is Oghma, a warrior of the Túatha Dé Danann who is also credited with inventing the Ogham alphabet. Both Ogmios and Ogma are known as smiling deities of eloquence. Ogma is attested from Old and Middle Irish literature, which dates to significantly later periods than the material for Ogmios.

References 

 Egger, Rudolf. (1962–63). Römische Antike und frühes Christentum: Ausgewählte Schriften von Rudolf Egger; Zur Vollendung seines 80. Lebensjahres, ed. Artur Betz and Gotbert Moro. 2 vols. Klagenfurt: Verlag des Geschichtsvereines für Kärnten

Gaulish gods
Psychopomps
Heracles
Lion deities